KTMT may refer to:

KTMT (AM), a radio station (580 AM) licensed to Ashland, Oregon, United States
KTMT-FM, a radio station (93.7 FM) licensed to Medford, Oregon, United States